Stone is a hamlet in the civil parish of Maltby, in the Rotherham district lying to the south of Rotherham, South Yorkshire, England. Roche Abbey stands to the west of the hamlet, with Sandbeck Park to the north.

Firbeck Dike 

The Firbeck Dike flows through the hamlet. Stone Mill, dating back to 17th century, still stands on the dike.

References 

Hamlets in South Yorkshire
Geography of the Metropolitan Borough of Rotherham